Qusheh Bolagh may refer to:
 Qusheh Bolagh, Kaleybar
 Qusheh Bolagh, Maragheh
 Qusheh Bolagh, Meyaneh